In mathematics, a comodule or corepresentation is a concept dual to a module.  The definition of a comodule over a coalgebra is formed by dualizing the definition of a module over an associative algebra.

Formal definition 
Let K be a field, and C be a coalgebra over K.  A (right) comodule over C is a K-vector space M together with a linear map

such that
 
 ,
where Δ is the comultiplication for C, and ε is the counit.

Examples 
 A coalgebra is a comodule over itself.
 If M is a finite-dimensional module over a finite-dimensional K-algebra A, then the set of linear functions from A to K forms a coalgebra, and the set of linear functions from M to K forms a comodule over that coalgebra.
 A graded vector space V can be made into a comodule. We turn  into a coalgebra and V into a -comodule, as follows:

In algebraic topology 
One important result in algebraic topology is the fact that homology  over the dual Steenrod algebra  forms a comodule. This comes from the fact the Steenrod algebra  has a canonical action on the cohomologyWhen we dualize to the dual Steenrod algebra, this gives a comodule structureThis result extends to other cohomology theories as well, such as complex cobordism and is instrumental in computing its cohomology ring . The main reason for considering the comodule structure on homology instead of the module structure on cohomology lies in the fact the dual Steenrod algebra  is a commutative ring, and the setting of commutative algebra provides more tools for studying its structure.

Rational comodule 
If M is a (right) comodule over the coalgebra C, then M is a (left) module over the dual algebra C∗, but the converse is not true in general: a module over C∗ is not necessarily a comodule over C.  A rational comodule is a module over C∗ which becomes a comodule over C in the natural way.

Comodule morphisms 
Let R be a ring, M, N, and C be R-modules, and

be right C-comodules. Then an R-linear map  is called a (right) comodule morphism, or (right) C-colinear, if

This notion is dual to the notion of a linear map between vector spaces, or, more generally, of a homomorphism between R-modules.

See also 

 Divided power structure

References 

Module theory
Coalgebras